Howard Vincent Hendrix (born 1959) is an American scholar and  science fiction writer.. He is the author of the novels Lightpaths and Standing Wave, Better Angels, Empty Cities of the Full Moon, The Labyrinth Key, and Spears of God.  His early short stories are found in the ebook Mobius Highway.

Early life, family and education
Howard Vincent Hendrix was born in 1959 in Cincinnati, Ohio, United States.

He graduated in 1980 with a Bachelor of Science degree in biology from Xavier University. He earned a Master's (1982) and a Ph.D (1987) in English literature from the University of California at Riverside.

Career
Hendrix published his first short story, "Bad/Night/Vision", in 1983 in UC Riverside's art and literary journal, Mosaic. Since then, he has published over 30 short stories and poems as well as six science fiction novels, beginning with Lightpaths in September 1997 through Ace Books. His most recent novel is the 2006 Spears of God, published through Del Rey. His poem “Bumbershoot” won the 2010 Dwarf Stars Award from the Science Fiction Poetry Association.

He is an English professor at California State University, Fresno.

Bibliography

Fiction

Novels
 
 
 Better Angels (1999)
 Empty Cities of the Full Moon (2001)
 The Labyrinth Key (2004)
 Spears of God (2006)

Short fiction and poetry
"Wittgenstein's Sin" (poem), Mosaic, Spring 1981
"Bad/Night/Vision" (experimental short story), Mosaic, Spring 1983
"Song of the USD" (poem), Mosaic, Spring 1984
"In the Smoke" (short story and prize-winner) Writers of the Future #2 March 1986
"The Rasta Man" (short story), Leading Edge #12, Spring 1987
"The High, Hard Way: A Mountain Prayer" and "Song for a Deaf Woodsman" (poems) as well as "A Lesson in Perspective," "A Day of the Comet," "Avatars" and "Hole in the Road" (short stories) in The Mystic Muse, Summer 1987, Fall 1987, Spring 1988, and Summer 1988 issues
"Doctor Doom Conducting" (short story), Aboriginal SF, Sept-Oct 1987
"Chameleon on a Mirror" (short story), EOTU, February 1988
"The Last Impression of Linda Vista" (short story), Aboriginal SF, July 1988
"In-Flight Entertainment" (short story), EOTU, August 1988
"The Farm System" (short story), Full Spectrum 1, Bantam Books, Fall 1988
"The Notorious Sitting Judge of Bullfrog County" (short story), Tales of the Unanticipated #4, Fall/Winter 1988
"The Art of Memory" (short story), EOTU, June 1989
"Desert Rainstorm" (poem), Wide Open, Fall 1989
"The Voice of the Dolphin in Air" (short story), Starshore #2, July/Fall 1990
Testing, Testing, 1, 2, 3 ("mini-anthology" of several short stories previously published during the 1987-1989 per od), EOTU Group, July 1990
The Unfinished Sky" (short story) Starshore #4, Spring 1991
"Singing the Mountain to the Stars" (novelette), Aboriginal SF, Jan Feb 1991
"Almost Like Air" (short story), Amazing Stories, September 1991
"Chameleon on a Mirror" (short story), Amazing Stories, January 1992
"Beholding Aphrodite" (short story), Tales of the Unanticipated, April 1992
"A Fine Old Tradition" (short story), Pulphouse #19 (scheduled)
"At the Shadow of a Dream" (short story), Aboriginal SF, SpAng 1993
"Ah! Bright Wings" (novelette), Full Spectrum 4, Bantam Boolcs, April 1993
"Tombe" (short story), Expanse, January 1994
"Gingko" (poem), Isaac Asimov's Science Fiction Magazine, November 1994
The Vertical Fruit of the Horizontal Tree (novella chapbook), Talisman Press, Oct. 1994
"The Music of What Happens" (novelette), Full Spectrum 5, Bantam Books, 1995
"If These Walls Could Talk" (novelette). The Outer Limits. Volume One, 1996
 “Incandescent Bliss” (short story) in Asimov’s Science Fiction Magazine, June 2002
 “Once Out of Nature” (short story) in Microcosms, ed. Gregory Benford, DAW Books, 2004
 “The Self-Healing Sky” (short story) in Aeon Speculative Fiction Magazine, March 2005
 “Waiting For Citizen Godel” (short story) in Aeon Speculative Fiction Magazine, Nov 2005
 “All’s Well at World’s End” (short story) in Future Shocks, Roc Books, January 2006
 “Palimpsest” (short story) in Analog Science Fiction Science Fact, September 2007
 “Knot Your Grandfather’s Knot” (short story) in Analog Science Fiction Science Fact, March 2008
 “Flame of Branches” (short story) in vMeme21 (new media/multimedia, June 2009)
 “Monuments of  Unageing Intellect” (novelet) in Analog Science Fiction Science Fact (June 2009)

Nonfiction

"'To luf hem wel, and leve hem not': The Neglected Humor of Gawain's 'Anti-feminism."' Comitatus Vol. 14 (1983): 38-48.
"Reasonable Failure: Pearl Considered as a Self-Consuming Artifact of 'Gostly Porpose."' Neuphilologische Mitteilungen 4/L~II (1985): 458-466.
"The Thing of Shapes to Come: Science Fiction as Anatomy of the Future." In Stormwarnings: Science Fiction Confronts the Future, Ed. George E. Slusser, Colin Greenland, and Eric S. Rabkin. Carbondale: Southern Illinois University Press, 1987.
The Ecstasy of Catastrophe: A Study of the Apocalyptic Tradition From Langland To Milton. Peter Lang Publishing, Inc. July 1990.
"Those Wandring Eyes of His': Watching Guyon Watch the Naked Damsels Wrestling." Assays VII. Ed. Peggy A. Knapp and Gary F. Waller. Carnegie Mellon University Press, 1992.
"Dual Immortality, No Kids: The Dink Link Between Birthlessness and Deathlessness in Science Fiction." In Immortal Engines. Ed. by Slusser, Westfahl, and Rabkin. Atlanta: University of Georgia Press, 1996.
"Making the Pulpmonster Safe for Demography: OMNI Magazine and the Gentrification of Science Fiction." In Science Fiction and Market Realities. Ed. by Westfahl, Slusser, and Rabkin. Atlanta: University of Georgia Press, 1996.
"Baby's Next Step: Uberkinder and the Burden of the Future. In Nursery Realms -- Children in the Worlds of Science Fiction, Fantasy, and Horror. Ed. by Westfahl and Slusser. Atlanta: University of Georgia Press, 1999.

Awards

 Abraham L. Polonsky Award winner, 1983, for "Bad/Night/Vision"
 Writers of the Future Third Quarter First Place, 1986, for "In the Smoke"
 Nebula Award nominee (several times), Science Fiction Writers of America, 1986-1994
 Theodore Sturgeon Memorial Award nominee, 1994, for "At the Shadow of a Dream"
 Pushcart Prize nominee, 1989, for "The Art of Memory"

International Pixel-Stained Technopeasant Day

Hendrix created a stir among science fiction and fantasy fans and authors with a LiveJournal posting on April 12, 2007. The purpose of the posting was to explain, in part, why he would not be seeking the presidency of the Science Fiction and Fantasy Writers of America after having served as its vice president. He criticized authors who offer their works for free on the internet, either as written works, or recorded as podcasts. His comments have drawn criticism from a number of other authors, such as Jo Walton, Michael A. Stackpole, John Scalzi, and David Wellington, and resulted in International Pixel-Stained Technopeasant Day.

References

External links
 Celebration of International Pixel-Stained Technopeasant Day

1959 births
Living people
20th-century American novelists
21st-century American novelists
American male novelists
American science fiction writers
University of California, Riverside alumni
Writers from Cincinnati
Xavier University alumni
American male short story writers
20th-century American poets
21st-century American poets
American male poets
20th-century American short story writers
21st-century American short story writers
20th-century American male writers
21st-century American male writers
Novelists from Ohio
Analog Science Fiction and Fact people